The 2022 Canada Open (officially known as the Yonex Canada Open 2022 for sponsorship reasons) was a badminton tournament which took place at Markin-MacPhail Centre in Calgary, Canada, from 27 September to 2 October 2022 and had a total purse of $75,000.

Tournament 
The 2022 Canada Open was the fourth Super 100 tournament of the 2022 BWF World Tour and also part of the Canada Open championships, which had been held since 1957. This tournament was organized by the Badminton Alberta and Badminton Canada and sanctioned by the BWF.

Venue 
This international tournament was held at Markin-MacPhail Centre in Calgary, Alberta, Canada.

Point distribution 
Below is the point distribution table for each phase of the tournament based on the BWF points system for the BWF Tour Super 100 event.

Prize pool 
The total prize money was US$75,000 with the distribution of the prize money in accordance with BWF regulations.

Men's singles

Seeds 

 Brian Yang (quarter-finals)
 Kevin Cordón (withdrew)
 Misha Zilberman (semi-finals)
 Arnaud Merklé (semi-finals)
 Jason Ho-Shue (quarter-finals)
 Ygor Coelho (quarter-finals)
 Pablo Abián (third round)
 Victor Svendsen (quarter-finals)

Finals

Top half

Section 1

Section 2

Bottom half

Section 3

Section 4

Women's singles

Seeds 

 Carolina Marín (semi-finals)
 Michelle Li (champion)
 Beiwen Zhang (quarter-finals)
 Saena Kawakami (semi-finals)
 Qi Xuefei (quarter-finals)
 Natsuki Nidaira (quarter-finals)
 Léonice Huet (second round)
 Lauren Lam (second round)

Finals

Top half

Section 1

Section 2

Bottom half

Section 3

Section 4

Men's doubles

Seeds 

 Hiroki Okamura / Masayuki Onodera (semi-finals)
 Vinson Chiu / Joshua Yuan (quarter-finals)
 Ayato Endo / Yuta Takei (champions)
 Adam Dong / Nyl Yakura (quarter-finals)
 Jason Ho-Shue / Joshua Hurlburt-Yu (quarter-finals)
 Takuto Inoue / Kenya Mitsuhashi (final)
 Shuntaro Mezaki / Haruya Nishida (semi-finals)
 Masato Takano / Katsuki Tamate (quarter-finals)

Finals

Top half

Section 1

Section 2

Bottom half

Section 3

Section 4

Women's doubles

Seeds 

 Rachel Honderich / Kristen Tsai (semi-finals)
 Catherine Choi / Josephine Wu (quarter-finals)
 Francesca Corbett / Allison Lee (quarter-finals)
 Lee Chia-hsin / Teng Chun-hsun (semi-finals)
 Rui Hirokami / Yuna Kato (final)
 Rena Miyaura / Ayako Sakuramoto (champions)
 Sayaka Hobara / Hinata Suzuki (quarter-finals)
 Inés Castillo / Paula la Torre Regal (second round)

Finals

Top half

Section 1

Section 2

Bottom half

Section 3

Section 4

Mixed doubles

Seeds 

 Hiroki Midorikawa / Natsu Saito (final)
 Yujiro Nishikawa / Saori Ozaki (quarter-finals)
 Vinson Chiu / Jennie Gai (quarter-finals)
 Patrick Scheiel / Franziska Volkmann (second round)
 Ty Alexander Lindeman / Josephine Wu (quarter-finals)
 Misha Zilberman / Svetlana Zilberman (second round)
 Ye Hong-wei / Lee Chia-hsin (champions)
 Nicolas Nguyen / Alexandra Mocanu (withdrew)

Finals

Top half

Section 1

Section 2

Bottom half

Section 3

Section 4

References

External links 
Tournament link
Official Website

Canadian Open (badminton)
Canada Open
Canada Open
Sport in Calgary
Canada Open
Canada Open